Palmoclathrus is a monotypic genus of alga. The only species in the genus is Palmoclathrus stipitatus.

References

External links
 AlgaeBase entry

Monotypic algae genera
Chlorophyta genera
Palmophyllophyceae